Kamiiida Choseichi is an earthfill dam located in Gifu Prefecture in Japan. The dam is used for irrigation and water supply. The catchment area of the dam is 0.1 km2. The dam impounds about 2  ha of land when full and can store 70 thousand cubic meters of water. The construction of the dam was started on 1965 and completed in 1975.

References

Dams in Gifu Prefecture
1975 establishments in Japan